Luže is a village in the Municipality of Šenčur in the Upper Carniola region of Slovenia.

Name
Luže was first attested in written sources in 1154 as Lusse (and as Lausach in 1238). The name is shortened from the demonym *Lužane, literally 'people living near a pond', derived from the Slovene common noun *luža 'pond, puddle'. In the past the German name was Lausach.

Church
The church in the village is dedicated to John the Baptist. It is a gothic single-aisle church that was rebuilt in the early 19th century. Its belfry was originally separate from the nave, but with expansion during rebuilding it became part of the church structure. The main altar dates to 1886. The church contains a Baroque altar dating to 1691 and a painting by Jurij Šubic (1855–1890).

Notable people
Notable people that were born or lived in Luže include:
John Zaplotnik (a.k.a. Janez Leon Zaplotnik, 1883–1978), priest, journalist, and biographer

References

External links
Luže at Geopedia

Populated places in the Municipality of Šenčur